The Chipping Norton Limestone is a geological formation in the Cotswolds, England. It preserves fossils dating back to the Bathonian (Middle Jurassic). Including those of dinosaurs Cetiosaurus, Megalosaurus and Cruxicheiros as well as the Tritylodontid Stereognathus. It primarily consists of ooidal limestone.

Fossil content 
The so-called "Scrotum humanum" remains may have come from this formation.

See also 
 List of dinosaur-bearing rock formations
 List of fossiliferous stratigraphic units in England

References

Bibliography 
 Weishampel, David B.; Dodson, Peter; and Osmólska, Halszka (eds.): The Dinosauria, 2nd, Berkeley: University of California Press. 861 pp. .

Geologic formations of England
Middle Jurassic Europe
Jurassic England
Jurassic System of Europe
Bathonian Stage
Limestone formations
Paleontology in England